Aharon Meskin (1898–1974) was an Israeli stage actor.

Biography
Aharon Meskin was born in 1898 in Mogilev in the Russian Empire (now in Belarus). His parents were Moshe Meskin and Rashel Chasanov. Following the Russian Revolution, Maskin joined the Red Army, in which he became an officer and, in 1919, was responsible for the distribution of food to the residents of Moscow. During this period, he met members of recently founded Habima Theatre in Moscow and provided them with food.

He joined Habima Theatre in 1922, and appeared in its production of the play, The Dybbuk by S. Ansky.

In 1928, he immigrated to Mandate Palestine.

During his career on the Hebrew stage, Meskin played many leading roles, including Othello; the Golem; Shylock (in The Merchant of Venice); Willy Loman in Death of a Salesman; the black pastor Stephen Kumalo in Cry, The Beloved Country; Captain Queeg in The Caine Mutiny and many others. His final performance was in Nisim Aloni's The Gypsies of Jaffa, produced in 1971.

Awards and recognition

 In 1960, Meskin was awarded the Israel Prize, in theatre.

See also
Culture of Israel
List of Israel Prize recipients
List of Israeli actors

References

1898 births
1974 deaths
Belarusian Jews
Jews in Mandatory Palestine
Israeli Jews
Soviet emigrants to Israel
Jewish Israeli male actors
Israeli male stage actors
Israel Prize in theatre recipients
People from Mogilev